Wirths is a German surname.  Notable people with the surname include:

 Carl Wirths (1897–1955), German politician
 Eduard Wirths (1909–1945), Nazi German SS doctor at Auschwitz concentration camp during World War II
 Günter Wirths (1911–2005), German chemist
 Harold J. Wirths, politician, Commissioner of the New Jersey Department of Labor and Workforce Development (2010–present).
 Wallace R. Wirths (1921–2002), former Westinghouse executive, author, newspaper columnist and radio commentator, and benefactor of Upsala College

See also
Wirth, a surname

German-language surnames